Below are the results of season eight of the World Poker Tour (2009-2010)

Results

WPT Venice
 Casino: Casino Di Venezia, Venice, Italy
 Buy-in: $5,302 + $530
 5-Day Event: May 6, 2009 to May 10, 2009
 Number of Entries: 397
 Total Prize Pool: $2,035,237
 Number of Payouts: 45

WPT Spanish Championship
 Casino: Casino Barcelona, Barcelona, Spain
 Buy-in: $6,988 + $419
 5-Day Event: June 26, 2009 to June 30, 2009
 Number of Entries: 160
 Total Prize Pool: $1,121,815
 Number of Payouts: 9

Bellagio Cup V
 Casino: Bellagio, Las Vegas, Nevada
 Buy-in: $15,000 + $400
 7-Day Event: July 13, 2009 to July 19, 2009
 Number of Entries: 268
 Total Prize Pool: $3,899,400
 Number of Payouts: 27

Legends of Poker
 Casino: The Bicycle Casino, Bell Gardens, California
 Buy-in: $9,800 + $200
 5-Day Event: August 22, 2009 to August 26, 2009
 Number of Entries: 279
 Total Prize Pool: $2,625,000
 Number of Payouts: 27

WPT Slovakia
 Casino: Golden Vegas, Bratislava, Slovakia
 Buy-in: €4,000 + €400
 5-Day Event: August 31, 2009 to September 4, 2009
 Number of Entries: 100
 Total Prize Pool:
 Number of Payouts: 18

WPT Merit Cyprus Classic
 Casino: Merit Crystal Cove Hotel and Casino, Cyprus
 Buy-in: $10,000 + $300
 7-Day Event: September 6, 2009 to September 12, 2009
 Number of Entries: 181
 Total Prize Pool: $1,810,000
 Number of Payouts: 18

Borgata Poker Open
 Casino: Borgata, Atlantic City, New Jersey
 Buy-in: $3,300 + $200
 6-Day Event: September 19, 2009 to September 24, 2009
 Number of Entries: 1,018
 Total Prize Pool: $3,359,400
 Number of Payouts: 100

WPT Marrakech
 Casino: Casino De Marrakech, Marrakech, Morocco
 Buy-in: €4,500
 8-Day Event: October 12, 2009 to October 19, 2009
 Number of Entries:  416
 Total Prize Pool: €1,812,000
 Number of Payouts: 54

Festa al Lago
 Casino: Bellagio, Las Vegas, Nevada
 Buy-in: $15,000 + $400
 7-Day Event: October 20, 2009 to October 26, 2009
 Number of Entries: 275
 Total Prize Pool: $4,001,250
 Number of Payouts: 27

World Poker Finals
 Casino: Foxwoods Resort Casino, Mashantucket, Connecticut
 Buy-in: $9,700 + $300
 6-Day Event: November 5, 2009 to November 10, 2009
 Number of Entries: 353
 Total Prize Pool: $3,424,100
 Number of Payouts: 36

Doyle Brunson Five Diamond World Poker Classic
 Casino: Bellagio, Las Vegas, Nevada
 Buy-in: $15,000 + $400
 7-Day Event: December 13, 2009 to December 19, 2009
 Number of Entries: 329
 Total Prize Pool: $4,761,450
 Number of Payouts: 27

Southern Poker Championship
 Casino: Beau Rivage, Biloxi, Mississippi
 Buy-in: $9,700 + $300
 4-Day Event: January 24, 2010 to January 27, 2010
 Number of Entries: 208
 Total Prize Pool: $1,930,000
 Number of Payouts: 18

L.A. Poker Classic
 Casino: Commerce Casino, Commerce, California
 Buy-in:
 2-Day Event: February 20, 2010
 Number of Entries: 564
 Total Prize Pool:
 Number of Payouts:
 Winning Hand:

L.A. Poker Classic
 Casino: Commerce Casino, Commerce, California
 Buy-in: $9,600 + $400
 6-Day Event: February 26, 2010 to March 4, 2010
 Number of Entries: 745
 Total Prize Pool: $7,152,000
 Number of Payouts: 72

Bay 101 Shooting Star
 Casino: Bay 101, San Jose, California
 Buy-in: $9,600 + $400
 5-Day Event: March 8, 2010 to March 12, 2010
 Number of Entries: 333
 Total Prize Pool: $3,163,500
 Number of Payouts: 36

Hollywood Poker Open
 Casino: Hollywood Casino, Lawrenceburg, Indiana
 Buy-in: $9,600 + $400
 5-Day Event: March 20, 2010 to March 24, 2010
 Number of Entries: 144
 Total Prize Pool: $1,331,616
 Number of Payouts: 12

WPT Bucharest
 Casino: Regent Casino, Bucharest, Romania
 Buy-in: € 3,000 + € 300
 8-Day Event: March 27, 2010 to April 2, 2010
 Number of Entries: 161
 Total Prize Pool: €449,450
 Number of Payouts: 18

WPT Championship
 Casino: Bellagio, Las Vegas, Nevada
 Buy-in: $25,000 + $500
 8-Day Event: April 17, 2010 to April 24, 2010
 Number of Entries: 195
 Total Prize Pool: $4,728,750
 Number of Payouts: 18

Other Events
During season 8 of the WPT there was one special event that did not apply to the Player of the Year standings:
 The WPT Celebrity Invitational - February 20–21, 2010 - Commerce Casino - prelude to Event #13: L.A. Poker Classic

References

World Poker Tour
2009 in poker
2010 in poker